James Christie Palmer Esten (November 7, 1805October 24, 1864) was a Canadian jurist. 

James Christie Palmer Esten was born on November 7, 1805, in St. George's, Bermuda. He was sent to England as a child and educated at Charterhouse School. He then studied law at Lincoln's Inn. After being called to the bar, he moved to Exeter and practised there briefly.

He came to Canada in either 1836 or 1837 and settled in Toronto, where he opened a law office. He practised until 1849, when he was appointed to the bench.

He died on October 24, 1864, in Toronto.

References 

1805 births
1864 deaths
19th-century Canadian lawyers
19th-century Canadian judges
People educated at Charterhouse School